Mutual coherence can refer to:

 Mutual coherence (physics), sinusoidal waves which exhibit a constant phase relationship
 Mutual coherence (linear algebra), a property of a matrix describing the maximum correlation between its columns

See also 

 Coherence (disambiguation)